Laski or Łaski may refer to the following Polish villages:

In Greater Poland Voivodeship (west-central Poland):
Laski, Jarocin County
Laski, Kępno County
Laski, Turek County

In Łódź Voivodeship (central Poland):
Laski, Pajęczno County
Laski, Piotrków County

In Lublin Voivodeship (east Poland):
Laski, Łuków County
Laski, Parczew County

In Lubusz Voivodeship (west Poland):
Laski, Świebodzin County
Laski, Gmina Babimost
Laski, Gmina Czerwieńsk
Laski, Żary County

In Masovian Voivodeship (east-central Poland):
Laski, Grójec County
Laski, Maków County
Laski, Radom County
Laski, Warsaw West County
Laski, Węgrów County

In Pomeranian Voivodeship (north Poland):
Laski, Bytów County
Laski, Malbork County

In Subcarpathian Voivodeship (south-east Poland)
Laski, Bojanów County
Łaski, Jasło County

In West Pomeranian Voivodeship (north-west Poland):
Laski, Białogard County
Laski, Sławno County

In other voivodeships:
Laski, Kuyavian-Pomeranian Voivodeship (north-central Poland)
Laski, Lesser Poland Voivodeship (south Poland)
Laski, Lower Silesian Voivodeship (south-west Poland)
Laski, Podlaskie Voivodeship (north-east Poland)

Other uses
Laski (surname)

See also
 Laskiainen
 Lasky
 Łask
 Łask County, called powiat łaski in Polish
 Lasker (disambiguation)